National service is conscription in Singapore; all male citizens and second-generation permanent residents are mandated by law to serve for around two years in either the Singapore Armed Forces (SAF), Singapore Civil Defence Force (SCDF) or the Singapore Police Force (SPF). Due to training safety regulations, training deaths are rare, but do occur from time to time. Below is a list of reported deaths that resulted from training incidents:

Training deaths in Singapore

Notes

References

Lists of Singaporean people